What's New Pussycat? is the second album released by Tom Jones, created to capitalize on the success of his then-current hit single, the theme song from What's New Pussycat?

The album also included songs that had been removed from the US version of Jones' debut album ("I've Got a Heart", "The Rose", "Some Other Guy", "Endlessly"). Jones had covered Little Richard's hit "Bama Lama Bama Loo" on the live EP Tom Jones on Stage earlier in the year, and the studio version appears here. His previous UK single ("With These Hands" b/w "Untrue") and other B-sides from the singles "Once Upon a Time" ("I Tell the Sea") and "It's Not Unusual" ("To Wait for Love") fill out the track list.

This album was unusual in that it originated from Jones' US label Parrot, and not from Decca.

What's New Pussycat? was released by London Records on Compact Disc with bonus tracks in 1987. These additional tracks include the A-side "Once Upon a Time", as well as Jones' contribution to the various artists benefit album 14 – Lord's Taverners ("Kiss, Kiss") and 2 outtakes from other sessions.

Track listing

Personnel
Peter Sullivan - producer
Bill Price - engineer
Les Reed - musical director
The Squires (Bill Parkinson, Chris Slade, Mickey Gee, Vernon Hopkins) - accompaniment on "Little By Little" and "Bama Lama Bama Loo"

References

1965 albums
Tom Jones (singer) albums
Albums produced by Peter Sullivan (record producer)